Flavio Lazzari (born 5 September 1986) is an Italian footballer who plays for Atletico Gallo Colbordolo as a midfielder.

Career
Lazzari started his career at Cisco Roma (known as Cisco Lodigiani in 2004–05 season), Rome's third football team.

Udinese
He was then signed by Udinese in summer 2005, and made his Serie A debut on 11 December 2005 against Lecce.

He signed a permanent deal in summer 2006, but he then farmed to Serie B clubs Modena and Messina. He spent the 2008–09 season on loan to Grosseto.

Empoli
On 31 August 2010, Udinese signed Gabriele Angella along with Diego Fabbrini in co-ownership deal for €3 million. As part of the deal, Ricardo Chará and Lazzari joined Empoli, also in co-ownership deal for a peppercorn.

He made his club debut on 5 September 2010, replacing injured Riccardo Nardini at first half. That match Empoli 0–0 draw with Varese. He made his first start on the next match, replacing absented Nardini. He then replaced regular starter Diego Fabbrini who had international duty, as left midfielder (442 formation), (451/4321 formation) and as the sole attacking midfielder (4312 formation), which he was replaced by Fabbrini in second half. He then lost his starting place and had to compete with Salvatore Foti for one of the starting place in attacking midfielders since round 9, which the coach sometimes used one more attacking midfielder (4231 formation) to partner with Fabbrini and Nardini.

In summer 2012 Udinese gave up the remain 50% registration rights of Lazzari to Empoli for free.

Novara
On 31 August 2012 he was swapped with Guillaume Gigliotti in a cashless deal. However both player were tagged for €1.5 million. He signed a 3-year contract. On 24 September 2013 Lazzari signed a new 4-year contract.

On 30 July 2014 he was signed by Pescara in a temporary deal.

References

External links

aic.football.it  
Profile at FIGC  

1986 births
Living people
Italian footballers
Italy youth international footballers
Udinese Calcio players
Modena F.C. players
A.C.R. Messina players
F.C. Grosseto S.S.D. players
Calcio Padova players
A.S.D. Gallipoli Football 1909 players
Empoli F.C. players
Novara F.C. players
Ascoli Calcio 1898 F.C. players
Vis Pesaro dal 1898 players
Serie A players
Serie B players
Serie C players
Association football midfielders
Footballers from Rome